The 35th World Science Fiction Convention (Worldcon), also known as SunCon, was held on 2–5 September 1977 at the Fontainebleau Hotel in Miami Beach, Florida, United States.

The chairman was Don Lundry.

Participants 

Attendance was approximately 3,240.

Guests of Honor 

 Jack Williamson (pro)
 Robert A. Madle (fan)
 Robert Silverberg (toastmaster)

Awards

1977 Hugo Awards 

 Best Novel: Where Late the Sweet Birds Sang by Kate Wilhelm
 Best Novella:
 "By Any Other Name" by Spider Robinson and
 "Houston, Houston, Do You Read?" by James Tiptree, Jr. (tie)
 Best Novelette: "The Bicentennial Man" by Isaac Asimov
 Best Short Story: "Tricentennial" by Joe Haldeman
 Best Professional Editor: Ben Bova
 Best Professional Artist: Rick Sternbach
 Best Amateur Magazine: Science Fiction Review, edited by Richard E. Geis
 Best Fan Writer:
 Susan Wood and
 Richard E. Geis (tie)
 Best Fan Artist: Phil Foglio

Other awards 

 Special Award: George Lucas for Star Wars
 John W. Campbell Award for Best New Writer: C. J. Cherryh
 Gandalf Grand Master Award: Andre Norton

See also 

 Hugo Award
 Science fiction
 Speculative fiction
 World Science Fiction Society
 Worldcon

References

External links 

 NESFA.org: The Long List
 NESFA.org: 1977 convention notes 
 Hugo.org: 1977 Hugo Awards
 Fanac.org: SunCon photos
 Audio recordings of the 1977 Hugo Award ceremony

1977 conferences
1977 in Florida
1977 in the United States
Miami Beach, Florida
Science fiction conventions in the United States
September 1977 events in the United States
Worldcon